Querbach may refer to:

Querbach (Westerbach), a river of Bavaria, Germany, headwater of the Westerbach
Przecznica, German name Querbach, a village in the administrative district of Gmina Mirsk, Lower Silesian Voivodeship, Poland